Holoprizus serratus is a species of beetle in the family Carabidae, the only species in the genus Holoprizus.

References

Scaritinae